Banlic station is a proposed railway station located on the South Main Line in Laguna, Philippines.

Description
Banlic is one of the two interchange points between the North–South Commuter Railway (NSCR) and the PNR South Long Haul inter-city rail lines. It is currently set to be the terminus of South Long Haul Phase 1 while , the planned passenger terminus of the system, shall only be built by Phase 4. Meanwhile,  being the next station to the south, is a terminus of the NSCR as a whole. This makes Banlic the penultimate station for southbound NSCR trains heading for Calamba and northbound South Long Haul trains heading for Sucat. It will also replace Mamatid station for the NSCR, located a few hundred meters to the north from the site.

The proposed station will feature six tracks, four from the South Long Haul and two from the NSCR. Four platforms have been allotted for the system with two side platforms for the NSCR, and one island and one side platform for the South Long Haul.

Other facilities
Also near the site is the Banlic rail yard, where NSCR South's trainsets shall be stored.

References

Philippine National Railways stations
Railway stations in Laguna (province)
Buildings and structures in Cabuyao